The 2013 Brisbane Broncos season was the 26th in the club's history. Coached by Anthony Griffin and captained by Sam Thaiday, they competed in the NRL's 2013 Telstra Premiership. Brisbane finished the regular season in 12th (out of 16), thus failing to qualify for the finals for the first time since 2010.

According to a 2013 report, the Brisbane Broncos had the highest brand equity of any Australian sporting brand. 2013 was however their worst season ever.

Season summary

Milestones
Round 1: Jack Reed played his 50th career game.
Round 2: Alex Glenn played his 100th career game.
Round 4: Jordan Kahu made his first grade debut.
Round 4: Corey Norman played his 50th career game.
Round 9: Jordan Kahu scored his 1st career try.
Round 10: Jake Granville made his first grade debut.
Round 12: Mitchell Dodds played his 50th career game.
Round 13: Mitchell Dodds scored his 1st career try.
Round 13: Justin Hodges played his 150th game for the club.
Round 14: Scott Prince scored his 1000th career point.
Round 16: Peter Wallace played his 150th career game.
Round 17: Corey Oates made his first grade debut.
Round 18: Corey Oates scored his 1st career try.
Round 18: Scott Anderson played his 50th career game.
Round 20: David Stagg played his 100th game for the club.
Round 22: Jordan Drew made his first grade debut and scored his 1st career try.
Round 24: Corey Parker played his 275th game for the club which moved him into second place on the Broncos' all-time games list only behind Darren Lockyer (355).
Round 26: Scott Prince played his 300th career game and his 50th game for the club.
Round 26: David Stagg played his 200th career game.

Squad List

Squad movement

Gains

Losses

Re-signings

Contract lengths

Ladder

Fixtures

Pre-season

Regular season

Statistics

Source:

Representatives
The following players have played a representative match in 2013.

Honours

League
Nil

Club
Player of the year: Corey Parker
Rookie of the year: Corey Oates
Back of the year: Josh Hoffman
Forward of the year: Corey Parker
Club man of the year: Jharal Yow Yeh

References

Brisbane Broncos seasons
Brisbane Broncos season